Piat, officially the Municipality of Piat, is a 4th class municipality in the province of Cagayan, Philippines. According to the 2020 census, it has a population of 24,805 people.

Piat is dubbed as the "Pilgrimage Center of Cagayan Valley" because of the thousands of devotees and tourists who come here to pay homage. It is the home of Our Lady of Piat which continues to be the source of inspiration and object of devotion of many Catholics in the region.

Etymology
There are quite a few conjectures on how Piat got its name. One has it is that it derives from "pias," an Ilokano word, in Ibanag "addulu" and in Tagalog, "kamiyas." Another has it that the word comes from "aggapiya," meaning "healer, masseuse," and a more credible version has it that it is derived from the Ibanag and Itawes word "piya" which means "goodness, kindness, health."

From Fr. Jose Bugarin's Dictionary "Pia-t, a tree, and the name of a town in the province in the Ytaves (Itawes) district."

History
The original people were the Itawes; at present, there are many Ibanag. Ilokano, Tagalog, Kapampangan and other dialect speakers. There are also families of Spanish and American descent. The head of the family was called "urayan" or "baruwang" and the council of elders "Kammaranan." There were also war leaders and braves called "mengal," and priestesses called "anitera" from the Spanish word called "anito" or "minangilu" in Ibanag, "mangilut" in Itawes and "baybaylan" in Bisayan; there were few priests among the ancient people.

In 1596, the Dominican Provincial, Fr. Miguel de San Jacinto named Piat as a mission in the Itawes region comprising the towns of Tabang, Malaueg, Tuao and Piat. The encomenderos then were Pedro Barreda, Juan de Arranda and Isabel de Cardona. In 1604, the Bishop, Diego de Soria, negotiated for more missionaries for the Itawes region. To help in the pacification and evangelization of the region, the Dominicans introduced the devotion to Our Lady of the Most Holy Rosary: in 1604, they brought the images of Our Lady from Macau and first enshrined it in Lallo, later bringing it to Piat 1622.

Geography
It is located in the south-west part of Cagayan province in what is known as the Itawes Region, along which the Rio Chico runs west, south, and north-west of the town until it debouches into the Rio Ibanag somewhere near Nassiping.

Barangays
Piat is politically subdivided into 18 barangays.

Climate

Demographics

Economy

Government
Piat, belonging to the second legislative district of the province of Cagayan, is governed by a mayor designated as its local chief executive and by a municipal council as its legislative body in accordance with the Local Government Code. The mayor, vice mayor, and the councilors are elected directly by the people through an election which is being held every three years.

Elected officials

Education
The Schools Division of Cagayan governs the town's public education system. The division office is a field office of the DepEd in Cagayan Valley region. The office governs the public and private elementary and public and private high schools throughout the municipality.

Tourism

 Basilica of Our Lady of Piat This site is visited by Roman Catholic pilgrims and is believed to exhibit miracles. The Basilica Minore of Our Lady of Piat is one of only 13 minor basilicas in the Philippines. It is distinguished as the home of the venerated Black Virgin Mary. The interior contains curved ceilings made of wood with historical images and accounts along the tops of the walls. Verandas inside the church add to the shrine's elegance. On the altar lies the Blessed Virgin Mary covered in glass. At the back of the church is a staircase leading to a window opening onto the back of the Virgin Mary where devotees can touch the dress of Our Lady.

 Bukal ng Buhay This spring allegedly bestows miracles and blessings. In April 2005, the spring started to draw crowds of devotees along with the woman who dreamed of the Miraculous Lady of Visitation of Piat. 10 years earlier while working abroad she received a dream where it was insisted that she personally go to Piat to look for the hidden spring near the sanctuary on the hill where the Miraculous Lady was being enshrined. From that day on the spring became a crowd attraction, even drawing people from the medical fields. Devotees share stories on how they get healed of their ailments or recover from their surgical operations after drinking and washing themselves with the miraculous water drawn from this “Bukal ng Buhay”. The bukal was featured on several television documentaries in the Philippines such as Rated K and Kapuso Mo, Jessica Soho.

References

External links

Our Lady of Piat Basilica
[ Philippine Standard Geographic Code]
Philippine Census Information

Municipalities of Cagayan
Populated places on the Rio Chico de Cagayan
Catholic pilgrimage sites
1596 establishments in the Spanish Empire